Philotheca kalbarriensis is a species of flowering plant in the family Rutaceae and is endemic to Western Australia. It is a shrub with reddish brown branchlets and crowded, narrow spindle-shaped leaves and single white flowers arranged in leaf axils.

Description

Taxonomy and naming
Philotheca kalbarriensis was first formally described in 1998 by Paul Wilson in the journal Nuytsia from specimens collected in 1996 by Greg Keighery and Neil Gibson in Kalbarri National Park.

Distribution and habitat
This species of philotheca grows in woodland from Kalbarri to near Mullewa.

Conservation status
This species is classified as "Priority Two" by the Western Australian Government Department of Parks and Wildlife meaning that it is poorly known and from only one or a few locations.

References

kalbarriensis
Flora of Western Australia
Sapindales of Australia
Plants described in 1998
Taxa named by Paul G. Wilson